Caste is a 1930 British drama film directed by Campbell Gullan and starring Hermione Baddeley, Nora Swinburne and Alan Napier. It was made at Walton Studios. Michael Powell worked on the screenplay and (uncredited) was involved with the technical side of direction.

Cast
 Hermione Baddeley as Polly Eccles  
 Nora Swinburne as Esther Eccles  
 Alan Napier as Capt. Hawtree  
 Sebastian Shaw as Hon. George d'Alroy 
 Ben Field as Albert Eccles  
 Edward Chapman as Sam Gerridge  
 Mabel Terry-Lewis as Marquise 
 Percival Coyte

Critical reception
Film historian Geoff Brown writes, "most of the film’s enlivening spice comes from the jolting surprises of tone and manner as Gullan’s cast and Powell’s visuals glide or lurch through a scenario pleasingly punctured with camera trackings, lively spots of audiovisual montage and dramatically piquant closeups. (Watch for the carefully judged shots of hands delivering and receiving a crucial telegram regarding D’Alroy’s fate.)...the film is not a fossil; it is a lively embryo, and the first important step towards Powell’s future."

References

Bibliography
 Low, Rachael. Filmmaking in 1930s Britain. George Allen & Unwin, 1985.
 Wood, Linda. British Films, 1927-1939. British Film Institute, 1986.

External links
 
 “Where did you get this old fossil?”: Michael Powell’s first film rediscovered: Sight & Sound website article by Geoff Brown

1930 films
British drama films
1930 drama films
Films shot at Nettlefold Studios
Films directed by Campbell Gullan
Quota quickies
British black-and-white films
1930s English-language films
1930s British films